The Journal of Structural Biology is a peer-reviewed scientific journal concerning the structural analysis of biological materials at all levels of organization and the functional consequences of such observations. The editors-in-chief are A.C. Steven (Silver Spring, MD, United States) and Wolfgang Baumeister (Max-Planck-Institute of Biochemistry).

According to  the Journal Citation Reports, the journal has a 2014 impact factor of 3.231, ranking it 109th out of 289 journals in the category "Biochemistry & Molecular Biology", 23rd out of 73 journals in the category "Biophysics", and 98th out of 184 journals in the category "Cell Biology".

References

External links 
 

Elsevier academic journals
Publications established in 1957
Monthly journals
English-language journals
Biochemistry journals